Everything Collide is the second release from the Minneapolis, Minnesota pop rock band Sing It Loud. It was released on Epitaph Records on May 11, 2010.

Track listing

Credits
 Pat Brown - Lead Vocals, Guitar
 Kieren Smith - Lead Guitar, background vocals, lead vocals on "Shadows"
 Nate Flynn - Bass Guitar
 Ben Peterson - Keyboards, Background vocals
 Chris "Sick Boy" Lee - Drums

Additional credits
 Jordan Schmidt - Composer on "Here With You", Engineer, Mixer, Producer
 Don Clark - Design
 Janice Cruz - Composer on "Only One"
 Todd Kolojeski - Engineer
 UE Nastasi - Mastering
 Rob Oesterlin - Assistant Engineer
 Mike Shipley - Mixing
 Alexandro Suarez - Composer on "Only One"
 Brian Wohlgemuth - Assistant, Pro-Tools

References

2010 albums
Epitaph Records albums